Oulton Broad South railway station is on the East Suffolk Line in the east of England, and is one of two stations serving Oulton Broad, Suffolk. The station is  measured from London Liverpool Street via Ipswich.

It is managed by Greater Anglia, which also operates all trains that call.

History

The line had been promoted by the Lowestoft and Beccles Railway but they were acquired by the East Suffolk Railway  on 23 July 1858, before the line opened.

The station was renamed Oulton Broad South  on 26 September 1927.  At least one camping coach was positioned here by the Eastern Region from 1952 to 1965, from 1955 to 1960 there were two coaches and three in 1961, from 1961 they were all Pullman camping coaches.

The station was part of the 1984 modernisation of the East Suffolk Line. By 1986, the line was equipped with automated level crossings and radio signalling. However, to ensure the line's survival, two sections were also singled.

At the eastern end of the platforms the lines passed under a main road from Beccles to Oulton Broad, and just east of this point the line to Lowestoft had a junction to the Kirkley branch, a single-track branch line designed to service a number of sites on the southern side of Lake Lothing. This line also served the Kirkley goods depot adjacent to Beaconsfield Road and the Fen Park. The branch was closed in stages during the 1960s and 1970s, as some of the larger businesses it served also closed down. The line from Durban Road to the goods yards was closed in 1967, although much of the track remained in place until the final closure of the line on 31 December 1972. The final section of the goods yard from the bridge in Mill Road is now a car-park, and a school playing field occupies the site of the other four-siding yard near the park. The line adjacent to the junction with the East Suffolk Line is now a residential caravan site, although the remains of the track bed continue along Victoria Road heading east. Numerous properties have been built on sections of this line.

The signal box at the junction was demolished and no trace remains. Signalling functions were transferred to the box at Oulton Broad North.

Services
 the typical Monday-Saturday off-peak service at Oulton Broad South is as follows:

On Sundays frequency reduces to one train every two hours in each direction. Trains extending to and from London Liverpool Street were withdrawn in 2010.

References

External links 

Railway stations in Suffolk
DfT Category F2 stations
Former Great Eastern Railway stations
Greater Anglia franchise railway stations
Railway stations in Great Britain opened in 1859
Lowestoft